Jhaverchand Meghani Award (Gujarati: ઝવેરચંદ મેઘાણી પુરસ્કાર) or Jhaverchand Meghani Folklore Award (Gujarati: ઝવેરચંદ મેઘાણી લોકસાહિત્ય પુરસ્કાર) is a literary award which is given for notable contribution to the Gujarati folk literature. Named after Gujarati author Jhaverchand Meghani, the award was established by Jhaverchand Meghani Lok Sahitya Kendra (Jhaverchand Meghani Folk Literature Center), Saurastra University, Rajkot.

The winner of the award is given cash prize of ₹ 100,000 and citation.

Awardees
From 2012, this award is given to prominent contributors in the field of Gujarati Folk Literature.

References

Gujarati literary awards
Awards established in 2012
2012 establishments in Gujarat